Yawkey Athletics Center is a  facility located on the north end of Alumni Stadium on the Boston College campus. Opened in February 2003, it houses the football team's offices, weight room, sports medicine, and locker room. The facility also contains Learning Resources for Student-Athletes, and the Murray Room, a large function area for general University use.

References

External links 
 Yawkey Athletics Center

2003 establishments in Massachusetts
Boston College Eagles football
Boston College Eagles sports venues